The Paul Robeson tomato is a Russian heirloom tomato that was named after Paul Robeson, the American singer, actor and human-rights advocate.

See also
List of tomato cultivars

References

Heirloom tomato cultivars